The Sacramento Fire Department provides fire protection and emergency medical services to the city of Sacramento, California. The department was first organized on February 5, 1850. It was not until March 30, 1872, when it finally became the first paid fire department west of the Mississippi River. Additionally, the city also provides contracted services for the Pacific Fruitridge Fire Protection District and Natomas Fire Protection District to provide emergency services.

Stations & Apparatus 
The city itself has 20 fire stations spread across the city.  It also operates out of 4 additional stations which are Contracted out to the City of Sacramento. In Addition, there is also a Reserve Station. Each station has a fire engine as well as other specialty rigs. All specialty rigs, such as the wildland fire engines and the hazardous material truck are cross-staffed by engine and truck personnel.  There are also four boats spread across the stations for rescues in the two rivers that both run through, and border Sacramento, the American River and the Sacramento River, respectively.

USAR Task Force 7

The Sacramento Fire Department is the sponsoring agency for California USAR Task Force 7 (CA TF-7), one of the eight FEMA Urban Search and Rescue Task Forces in the state. These USAR Task Forces, which were originally designed to respond to structural collapse caused by earthquakes, have evolved to be used at disasters and catastrophes, both man-made and natural. Along with members of the SFD, the task force also has members from the Folsom Fire Department, Roseville Fire Department, West Sacramento Fire Department, El Dorado County Fire Protection District and Sacramento Metropolitan Fire District.

Some of the teams most notable deployments include the Northridge earthquake (1994), Oklahoma City bombing (1995), World Trade Center (2001) Hurricane Katrina (2005) Hurricane Harvey (2017) and Hurricane Maria (2017)

References 

Fire departments in California
Fire Department
Ambulance services in the United States
Medical and health organizations based in California